The following lists of Polish politicians and party members are listed by party:

List of Centre Agreement politicians
List of Civic Platform politicians
List of Democratic Left Alliance politicians
List of Democratic Party – demokraci.pl politicians
List of Greens 2004 members
List of Law and Justice politicians
List of League of Polish Families politicians
List of Liberal Democratic Congress politicians
List of Polish Communist Party politicians
List of Polish People's Party politicians
List of Polish Socialist Party politicians
List of Polish United Workers' Party members
List of Polish Workers' Party politicians
List of Social Democracy of Poland politicians
List of Solidarity Electoral Action politicians

 

Politicians
Lists of politicians by nationality